Katelynne Goldie Sue Cox (born June 28, 1994) is an American singer, model, former cheerleader, and former news anchor from Camas, Washington. She has released two EPs, Unbelievable (2008) and Erase It (2014), and a studio album, One Girl (2011). Starting in 2016, Cox competed in four consecutive Miss District of Columbia contests. After winning the 2019 contest, she competed in Miss America 2020. She also represented the state of Missouri in the Miss Earth United States 2016 contest.

Biography 
Katelynne Cox was born on June 28, 1994, to Cameron Cox and Wendy Sturm, and grew up in Camas, Washington. Cox began competing in modeling competitions since she was seven, winning numerous state and national titles, including Miniature Miss Washington and Miss Washington Jr. Pre-teen. In 2009, she won the Miss American Teen Jr title at the National Miss American Coed Pageant. In 2008, at the age of fourteen, she launched her music career with the EP Unbelievable. In 2010 she appeared in two editions of Supermodels Unlimited, the second of which featured her on the cover. Cox explained that she was hoping that her magazine appearances would garner publicity for her music career, which she considered her primary goal.

The recording process for her album, which would be titled One Girl, took place in Nashville over the course of two years. Halfway through the process, Cox converted to Christianity. Although her lyrical focus changed after her conversion, she opted to keep the pop songs she had already recorded, as she felt that those songs could reach an audience that would not listen to Christian music. The album was released in 2011 through Red Hammer Records. In 2014, Cox released a second EP, Erase It, independently. From 2012 through 2014, Cox worked as a news anchor and producer at KOMU-TV.

In 2015, Cox, now a college graduate, was hired by the office of Representative Sam Graves as a legislative correspondent and staffer. She currently works at the United States Chamber of Commerce, a business-oriented lobbying firm. She also worked for the Sports & Entertainment Network as an anchor and analyst. In 2016, Cox competed in Miss District of Columbia, which selects a representative to compete in the Miss America pageant, and finished as Second Runner-Up. She competed as Miss Missouri in the 2016 Miss Earth United States contest. Cox competed again in the Miss District of Columbia pageants in 2017 and 2018, and each time again finished as Second Runner-Up. Cox was part of the Washington Capitals' cheerleading team, the Red Rockers, from 2017 through 2019. In 2019, her final year of eligibility, Cox won the Miss District of Columbia title. At the Miss America 2020 contest, Cox was a finalist for the Women in Business Scholarship awards. After the contest, Cox posted a video in which she alleged that the Miss America Organization and NBC tried to prevent her from mentioning in her introduction speech that she is a rape survivor nor allowed her to speak about her social impact initiative, Silence Is Not Compliance, which seeks to educate women about, and prevent, sexual assault. Miss America responded to the allegations, stating that it was specifically the website of Silence Is Not Compliance that Cox was prohibited from mentioning, not larger content of her prepared remarks.

Education 
Cox attended La Salle High School, and at the age fifteen was awarded a full scholarship to Clark College. She graduated both Clark College and Mountain View High School in 2012. During 2011 she also studied engineering at Vanderbilt University. After obtaining her Associate degree, she attended the University of Missouri, studying communications and political science and graduating in 2014 with a Bachelor's and Master's in Public Administration.

Discography
Unbelievable – 2008
One Girl – 2011
Erase It – 2014

References

Singers from Washington (state)
Female models from Washington, D.C.
1994 births
Miss Earth United States delegates
American performers of Christian music
Living people
University of Missouri alumni
Clark University alumni
Vanderbilt University alumni
People from Camas, Washington
21st-century American singers
21st-century American women singers